Hassad ( Jealousy) is a 2019 Pakistani family drama television series produced by Fahad Mustafa and Dr. Ali Kazmi under Big Bang Entertainment and directed by Aabis Raza. It stars Minal Khan, Arij Fatyma and Noor Hassan Rizvi. The show aired every Monday evening on ARY Digital.

Plot 
Naintara is happily married to Armaan. Both live happily and love each other immensely. However, their love for each other seems to face extreme jealousy and evil eye from Zareen who despises the idea of another couple's happiness, as she and Farhan; Zareen's husband and Armaan's older brother are unhappily married because Farhan gives his more attention to his work than her. One day, on the account of their anniversary, robbers attack their house. Armaan dies in the encounter with the robbers and from thereon, begins Naintara's suffering. Zareen tries everything in her power to make her life miserable, especially when she learns that Naintara is pregnant with Armaan's child. She tries her best in several ways to trap Naintara but Farhan soon realizes everything Zareen has been doing to Naintara. Naintara is found to be pregnant with a boy, and several months later, her boy - Arsalan is born. Farhan's mother advises him to marry Naintara to save her from the backbiting and gossip in their neighborhood. Naintara and Farhan get married, sparking Zareen's anger and jealousy even more.

Cast
Minal Khan as Naintara
Arij Fatyma as Zareen aka Zari
Noor Hassan Rizvi as Farhan; Naintara and Zari's husband
Saba Faisal as Sadiqa, Armaan and Farhan's mother
Nida Mumtaz as Nusrat; Zari and Kashee's mother
Ayaz Samoo as Kashee; Zari's brother
Arsalan Faisal as Dr. Bilal; Farhan's business partner
Shehroz Sabzwari as Armaan; Naintara's former husband (cameo)
Mehwish Qureshi as Rameen; Naintara's sister
Tipu Sharif as Rameen's husband, Naintara's brother-in-law

Digital release 

This series is available to watch on Indian OTT Platform MX Player App.

References

External links
Official website

Pakistani drama television series
Urdu-language television shows
ARY Digital original programming
2019 Pakistani television series debuts